The Hungarian composer Zoltán Kodály wrote his Sonata for Solo Cello in B minor, Op. 8, in 1915. It was first performed in 1918 and published in 1921.

It is among the most significant works for solo cello written since Johann Sebastian Bach's Cello Suites. It contains influences of Debussy and Bartók, as well as the inflections and nuances of Hungarian folk music.

Structure

The solo sonata is in three movements:

Premiere
Kerpely was the cellist of the Waldbauer-Kerpely Quartet, which had premiered the first four string quartets by Bartók. It was published by Universal Edition in Vienna in 1921.

Recognition
Kodály himself predicted that "in 25 years no cellist will be accepted who has not played it". Indeed, less than 40 years later, in 1956, the sonata was a set piece for the Casals Competition in Mexico City. The performance of the sonata by George Neikrug (1919–2019) in his debut at the New York Town Hall in 1947 was the first American performance of the work for many years.

Recordings
János Starker first played the sonata for Kodály at the age of 15, in 1939, then again in 1967 shortly before the composer's death. Kodály told Starker: "If you correct the ritard in the third movement, it will be the Bible performance." Starker recorded it four times (1948, 1950, 1956 and 1970), the 1948 78-rpm recording winning a Grand Prix du Disque.

References

Kodaly
Solo cello pieces
1915 compositions
Compositions by Zoltán Kodály
Compositions in B minor